Sunday Too Far Away is a 1975 Australian drama film directed by Ken Hannam. It belongs to the Australian Film Renaissance or the "Australian New Wave", which occurred during that decade.

The film is set on a sheep station in the Australian outback in 1955 and its action concentrates on the shearers' reactions to a threat to their bonuses and the arrival of non-union labour.

Acclaimed for its understated realism of the work, camaraderie and general life of the shearer, Jack Thompson plays the knock-about Foley, a heavy drinking gun shearer (talented professional sheep shearer), and while he makes a play for the station owner's daughter Sheila (Lisa Peers), the film is a presentation of various aspects of Australian male culture and not a romance; the film's title itself is reputedly the lament of an Australian shearer's wife: "Friday night [he's] too tired; Saturday night too drunk; Sunday, too far away".

Sunday Too Far Away won three 1975 Australian Film Institute awards: Best Film, Best Actor in a Leading Role and Best Actor in a Supporting Role.

Plot
In 1956, gun shearer Foley joins a new shearing team sharing a room with Old Garth, a once great shearer who is now a drunk. Foley and his team battle to get in a new cook, Old Garth dies and Foley befriends the grazier's daughter. Foley loses his status as top shearer to Arthur Black and blows most of his money gambling. The shearers go on strike and Foley and his team get involved in a brawl with non-union labour.

Cast
Jack Thompson as Foley
Max Cullen as Tim King
Robert Bruning as Tom West
Jerry Thomas as Basher
Peter Cummins as Arthur Black
John Ewart as Ugly
Sean Scully as Beresford
Reg Lye as Old Garth
Graham Smith as Jim the Learner
Laurie Rankin as Old Station Hand
Lisa Peers as Sheila
Philip Ross as Mr Dawson
Ken Shorter as Frankie

Production
The film was the first feature produced by the South Australian Film Corporation. They wanted to make a film about the Gallipoli campaign and considered a co-production with Crawford Productions. John Dingwall was signed to write it. However the film fell through when Crawfords fell out with the SAFC. Dingwall, still under contract to them, proposed instead a treatment called Shearers, based on his brother-in-law, who was a shearer. Matt Carroll at the SAFC was particularly enthusiastic and recruited Ken Hannam to direct. The original treatment concerned the 1956 shearer's strike. This ended up being condensed greatly.

Among the investors in the movie were the Australian Film Development Corporation.

Shooting began in May 1974 and took place near Port Augusta and Quorn in South Australia. It encountered rains and flood and was completed behind schedule in May.

The original cut of the film was over two hours. A number of scenes were reduced during post production, including the removal of Foley's romance with the grazier's daughter, and shifting Foley having a car crash from the end of the movie to the beginning. This caused a great deal of conflict between Ken Hannam, Gil Brearley and Matt Carroll.

Release
Before being released, the film won four major prizes at the Australian Film Awards in March 1975 and was selected for screening in the Directors' Fortnight at Cannes Film Festival in May.

Sunday Too Far Away grossed $1,356,000 at the box office in Australia ($ in  dollars).

See also

Cinema of Australia
South Australian Film Corporation

References

External links 
Sunday Too Far Away at the Internet Movie Database
Sunday Too Far Away at the National Film and Sound Archive
Sunday Too Far Away at Australian Screen Online
Sunday Too Far Away at Murdoch University Reading Room
Sunday Too Far Away at British Film Institute
Sunday Too Far Away at Oz Movies
Cinephilia
Sunday Too Far Away at New York Times
Kodak/Atlab Cinema Collection

1975 films
Australian drama films
Films shot in Flinders Ranges
Films about sheep
1975 drama films
Films set in 1955
Films directed by Ken Hannam
1970s English-language films
Films set in the Outback